François Simons (born 25 October 1946) is a retired Belgian swimmer. He competed at the 1964 and 1968 Summer Olympics in the 100 m and 200 m freestyle but failed to reach the finals.

References

1946 births
Living people
Belgian male freestyle swimmers
Olympic swimmers of Belgium
Swimmers at the 1964 Summer Olympics
Swimmers at the 1968 Summer Olympics
Swimmers from Antwerp